Rev. John Wesley (1636–78) was an English nonconformist minister. He was the grandfather of John Wesley (founder of Methodism).

Life
John Wesly (his own spelling), Westley, or Wesley was probably born at Bridport, Dorset, although some authorities claim he was born in Devon, the son of the Rev. Bartholomew Westley and Ann Colley, daughter of Sir Henry Colley of Carbery Castle in County Kildare, Ireland. He was educated at Dorchester Grammar School and as a student of New Inn Hall, Oxford, where he matriculated on 23 April 1651, and graduated B.A. on 23 January 1655, and M.A. on 4 July 1657. After his appointment as an evangelist, he preached at Melcombe Regis, Radipole, and other areas in Dorset. Never episcopally ordained, he was approved by Oliver Cromwell's Commission of Triers in 1658 and appointed Vicar of Winterborne Whitechurch.

The report of his interview in 1661 with Gilbert Ironside the elder, his diocesan, according to Alexander Gordon writing in the Dictionary of National Biography, shows him to have been an Independent. He was imprisoned for not using the Book of Common Prayer, imprisoned again and ejected in 1662. After the Conventicle Act 1664 he continued to preach in small gatherings at Preston and then Poole, until his death at Preston in 1678.

Family
He married a daughter of John White, who was related also to Thomas Fuller. White, the "Patriarch of Dorchester", married a sister of Cornelius Burges. Westley's eldest son was Timothy (born 1659). Their second son was Rev. Samuel Wesley, a High Church Anglican vicar and the father of John and Charles Wesley. A younger son, Matthew Wesley, remained a nonconformist, became a London apothecary, and died on 10 June 1737, leaving a son, Matthew, in India; he provided for some of his brother Samuel's daughters.

Notes

Additional sources
 Matthews, A. G., "Calamy Revised", Oxford University Press, 1934, page 521.

1636 births
1678 deaths
People from Bridport
Alumni of New Inn Hall, Oxford
Ejected English ministers of 1662
English Presbyterian ministers of the Interregnum (England)
John Westley